The Kwai Tsing Women's Volleyball Team is a women's volleyball club based in Kwai Tsing, Hong Kong. Established in 1988, they play in the Hong Kong Volleyball League – Division A1. They also participated as Hong Kong's representatives at the 2016 Asian Women's Club Volleyball Championship.

Roster
2016 Asian Women's Club Volleyball Championship

Head coach:  Lam Chun Kwok

Honours
Hong Kong Volleyball League – Division A
Second:2015
Hong Kong Volleyball Open Marathon – Division A
Champions:2016
Hong Kong Southern Districts Volleyball Championships
Champions:2015
2015 President Cup
Champions:2015

References

External links

1988 establishments in Hong Kong
Hong Kong volleyball clubs
Volleyball clubs established in 1988
Women's volleyball teams